"Rudolph, the Red-Nosed Reindeer" is a song by songwriter Johnny Marks based on the 1939 story Rudolph the Red-Nosed Reindeer published by the Montgomery Ward Company. Gene Autry's recording hit No. 1 on the U.S. charts the week of Christmas 1949.

History
In 1939, Marks' brother-in-law, Robert L. May, created the character Rudolph as an assignment for Montgomery Ward, and Marks decided to adapt the story of Rudolph into a song. English singer-songwriter and entertainer, Ian Whitcomb, interviewed Marks about the creation of the song in 1972.

The song had an added introduction, paraphrasing the poem "A Visit from Saint Nicholas" (in the public domain by the time the song was written), stating the names of the eight reindeer:

"You know Dasher and Dancer and Prancer and Vixen,
Comet and Cupid and Donner and Blitzen,
But do you recall
The most famous reindeer of all?"

The song was first introduced live on New York Radio (WOR) by crooner Harry Brannon in November 1949. Gene Autry recorded the song on June 27, 1949, and it was released as a children's record by Columbia Records in September 1949. By November, Columbia had begun pushing the record to the pop music market. It hit No. 1 in the US charts during Christmas 1949.

The song had been suggested as a "B" side for a record Autry was making. He first rejected it, but his wife convinced him to use it. The official date of its No. 1 status was the week ending January 7, 1950, making it the first No. 1 song of the 1950s. Autry's version of the song also holds the distinction of being the only chart-topping hit to fall completely off the chart after reaching No. 1. The success of the Christmas song gave support to Autry's subsequent popular Easter song, "Here Comes Peter Cottontail".

The song was also performed on the December 6, 1949, Fibber McGee and Molly radio broadcast by Teeny (Marian Jordan's little girl character) and the Kingsmen vocal group. The lyrics varied greatly from the Autry version. Autry's recording sold 1.75 million copies its first Christmas season and 1.5 million the following year. In 1969, it was awarded a gold disk by the RIAA for sales of 7 million, which was Columbia's highest-selling record at the time. It eventually sold a total of 12.5 million. Cover versions included, sales exceed 150 million copies, second only to Bing Crosby's "White Christmas".

Autry recorded another version of the song in the fall of 1957, and released it the same year through his own record label, Challenge Records. This version featured an accompaniment by a full orchestra and chorus. This was the only other version of the song Autry recorded and released on an album.

In 1959, Chuck Berry released a recording of a sequel, "Run Rudolph Run" (sometimes called "Run Run Rudolph"), originally credited to Berry but subsequent releases are often credited to Marks and Marvin Brodie.

In December 2018, Autry's original version entered the Billboard Hot 100 at No. 36, nearly 70 years after it first charted. It climbed to No. 27 the week ending December 22, 2018. and peaked at No. 16 the week ending January 5, 2019.

Other notable recordings

 1950: The song was recorded by Bing Crosby on June 22, 1950 with John Scott Trotter and his Orchestra.  His version reached No. 6 on Billboard's Best Selling Children's Records chart and No. 14 on Billboards pop singles chart that year.
 1950: Spike Jones and his City Slickers released a version of the song that peaked at No. 7 on Billboards pop singles chart and No. 8 on Billboards Best Selling Children's Records chart.
 1951: Red Foley and The Little Foleys released a version of the song that peaked at No. 8 on Billboards Best Selling Children's Records chart.
 1956: The Cadillacs released a doo-wop version of the song that peaked at No. 11 on Billboards Rhythm & Blues Records chart.
 1959: by Dean Martin is a very popular cover of the song every year. From the album A Winter Romance.
 1960: Alvin and the Chipmunks recorded a popular cover for their album Around the World with The Chipmunks that charted at No. 21 on the Billboard Hot 100. In their version, Rudolph himself sang with the Chipmunks, his vocals indicating suffering from a cold (hence the red nose).  They would record the song again for their 1961 album Christmas with The Chipmunks and their 1994 album A Very Merry Chipmunk as a duet with Gene Autry.
 1960:  The Melodeers released a doo-wop version of the song that peaked at No. 72 on Billboards Hot 100 singles chart.
 1964: Burl Ives recorded the song for the soundtrack of the holiday TV special Rudolph the Red-Nosed Reindeer. The soundtrack album containing Ives's version reached No. 142 on the Billboard 200 albums sales chart. He would re-record the song the following year for his holiday album Have a Holly Jolly Christmas.
 1968: The Temptations released a version of the song that peaked at No. 12 on Billboards special, year-end, weekly Christmas Singles chart (this same version later got as high as No. 3 on the same chart in December 1971). Their version of the song was also included on the group's 1970 Christmas album, The Temptations Christmas Card.

See also
 List of Christmas carols
 List of best-selling sheet music

References
ASCAP Work ID: 480058686 (ISWC: T0701273995)

External links
 
 Interview with Johnny Marks writing Rudolph the Red Nosed Reindeer

1910 Fruitgum Company songs
1949 songs
1949 singles

American Christmas songs
Barry Manilow songs
Bing Crosby songs
Burl Ives songs
Columbia Records singles
Dean Martin songs
Gene Autry songs
Grammy Hall of Fame Award recipients
Lynyrd Skynyrd songs
Music based on short fiction
Paul Anka songs
Songs about mammals
Songs about fictional male characters
Songs about Santa Claus
Songs written by Johnny Marks
The Crystals songs
Song recordings produced by Phil Spector
Song recordings with Wall of Sound arrangements
The Jackson 5 songs
The Supremes songs
The Temptations songs
Christmas novelty songs